Acacia neriifolia, also known as the oleander wattle, silver wattle or pechy wattle, is a tree in the genus Acacia native to north eastern Australia. It is common in the Moonbi Ranges.

Description
It often has an erect to spreading habit with flattened or angled branchlets towards the apices. The branchlets are finely haired with  silvery white hairs that can be yellowish on young shoots and are often covered in a fine white powder. Like most species of Acacia it has phyllodes rather than true leaves. The silvery-green coloured phyllodes have amore or less linear to narrowly elliptic shape and are straight or slightly curved.

Distribution
The plant is endemic to Queensland and New South Wales. It is found in New South Wales on the eastern tablelands and slopes of the Great Dividing Range, from around Tamworth and Barradine in the south extending north into Queensland. It is often found among granite outcrops as a part of dry sclerophyll forest and woodland communities.

Cultivation
In gardens it is useful as shade tree or as an informal screen that grows in full sun or part shade and is drought tolerant.

See also
 List of Acacia species

References 

Australian Broadcasting Corporation, ABC New England North West NSW, Monday, 19 August  2002 - Aussie natives in your garden - Acacia neriifolia
Australian National Botanic Gardens - photograph of Acacia neriifolia
Photograph

neriifolia
Flora of New South Wales
Flora of Queensland